The Snohomish are a Lushootseed Native American tribe who reside around the Puget Sound area of Washington, north of Seattle. They speak the Lushootseed language. The tribal spelling of their name is Sdoh-doh-hohbsh, which means "lowland people" according to the last chief of the Snohomish tribe, Chief William Shelton. Some commentators believe a more accurate spelling in the Latin alphabet would be Sdohobich, as their language has no nasal consonants.

Historians have debated the meaning of the name. Some believe it means "a style of union among those of the brave", while others interpret it as "Sleeping Waters." Other possible meanings include "many people" and even "a warrior tribe." Sometimes known as The Lowland People, the Snohomish have also been referred to as the Sinahomish (or Sneomuses).

History

Fishermen, hunters, and gatherers, the Snohomish formerly lived near the mouth of the Snohomish River, a Puget Sound tributary north of modern-day Everett, on the southern tip of Camano Island, on southern Whidbey Island and along the Snohomish River as far east as modern-day Monroe.

Among the Snohomish subdivisions in those locations, there were the Sdohobcs of the lower Snohomish River and Whidbey Island and the Sdocohobcs on the Snohomish River between Snohomish and Monroe. Other subdivisions were the N'Quentlamamishes (or Kwehtlamamishes) of the Pilchuck River.  Today the river, the city, and a county all bear their name.

In 1844, the Snohomish had 322 known members. A decade later, their population was 350, as they were potentially less affected by a smallpox plague of the time that had killed significant numbers of Native Americans in the Puget Sound area. In the 1980 census, there were 700 Snohomish, but by 2008 people identifying as Snohomish had increased to 1,200.

When the Snohomish encountered Hudson's Bay Company trader John Work in December 1824, they feared his party had come to attack them. They had long been in conflict with other tribes, such as the Klallams of the Strait of Juan de Fuca and the Cowichans of southeastern Vancouver Island. Once they realized the traders were friendly, a Snohomish warrior demonstrated how to kill the Cowichans, if they attacked. The Snohomish were among the tribes that traded with the Hudson's Bay Company at Fort Nisqually, established in 1833 at the southern tip of Puget Sound. They also met Roman Catholic missionaries who entered their lands in the early 1840s. At the time of these contacts, the Snohomish were governed by headmen, each leader having influence over several villages.

The traditional homeland of the Snohomish now constitutes Snohomish County. It was named in their honor.

Legal status
Many Snohomish are now enrolled in the federally recognized Tulalip Tribes of Washington. The Tulalip Reservation is west of the city of Marysville. However, most live elsewhere, including in the cities.

The Tulalip Confederation of Tribes Reservation was created under the Point Elliott Treaty, and on December 23, 1873 was enlarged by an executive order from 22,489.91 acres to 24,320 acres. It was in Snohomish lands, but was also intended to be shared by the Skykomish, the Snoqualmies, and the Stillaguamish. Early in the reservation period, Indian agent Reverend Eugene Casmir Chirouse, O.M.I., used different means to help the Native Americans survive the difficult transition. Many Snohomish left the reservation because the overcrowding that reduced their ability to survive in their forced environment. In the 1870s, even more left due to oppressive government policies that destroyed their traditional culture, language, way of life, and ability to earn their livelihood as they always had on their historical ancestral grounds.

Snohomish members are seeking federal recognition as a tribe. They argue that the Treaty of Point Elliott (1855) explicitly recognized them as a tribe, since they are listed by name.

Point Elliott Treaty of 1855
Nine Snohomish headmen signed the Point Elliott Treaty which was written by a council held for 1855 near present-day Mukilteo. About 350 Snohomish and their allies, the Snoqualmies, were represented by Chief Patkanim, who had originally been hostile to Americans, but had become impressed by their potential power. Patkanim allied himself with the Americans during the Indian War of 1855-1856, while most of the other Snohomish leaders had remained neutral. This neutrality prompted an Indian agent in February 1856 to recommend that Isaac Stevens, territorial governor and Superintendent Indian affairs, disband the tribe, since they were "doing nothing for us." As a result, the Snohomish and other neutral Indians were removed to other areas on the Puget Sound, including Fox and Whidbey Islands and Port Gamble in the Kitsap Peninsula.

Historical accounts and records are uncertain if the Snohomish and Coast Salish signatories of the Point Elliott Treaty fully understood the contents and consequences of the treaty.

Article 7 of the Point Elliott Treaty allows the President of the United States to subsequently act on behalf of the tribes affected by the agreement.

Notable Snohomish
 Boeda Strand, basket weaver
 Snah-talc, or Bonaparte, sub-chief of Snohomish
 Chief Patkanim
 William Shelton, chief
 Tommy Yarr, former NFL player and Notre Dame Fighting Irish football captain

Notes

References 

 Ruby, Robert H., John A. Brown, and Cary C. Collins.A Guide to the Indian Tribes Of The Pacific Northwest, Third Edition. Norman: University of Oklahoma Press, 2010. .

External links
Snohomish Tribe of Indians, official website

Native American tribes in Washington (state)
Lushootseed language